Hypolytrum is a genus of plant in the family Cyperaceae. It contains approximately 60–70 species, native to tropical Africa, Asia, Australia, Latin America and various oceanic islands.

Species include:
 Hypolytrum amorimii
 Hypolytrum bahiense
 Hypolytrum bullatum
 Hypolytrum heterophyllum
 Hypolytrum jardimii
 Hypolytrum leptocalamum
 Hypolytrum nemorum
 Hypolytrum paraense
 Hypolytrum pseudomapanioides, D.A.Simpson & Lye in press
 Hypolytrum subcompositus, Lye & D.A.Simpson

References

Further reading

Vinicius Alves, M., W. W. Thomas, and M. D. Lapa Wanderley. (2002). New species of Hypolytrum Rich. (Cyperaceae) from the Neotropics. Brittonia 54:2 124–34.

Cyperaceae
Cyperaceae genera
Taxonomy articles created by Polbot